Vincent is an unincorporated community located in Owsley County, Kentucky, United States. Its post office  is still open.

References

Unincorporated communities in Owsley County, Kentucky
Unincorporated communities in Kentucky
Coal towns in Kentucky